The 2010 Bucknell Bison football team was an American football team that represented Bucknell University during the 2010 NCAA Division I FCS football season. Bucknell tied for last among Patriot League competitors. 

In their first season under head coach Joe Susan, the  Bison compiled a 1–10 record. Josh Eden, Travis Nissley, Jason Vollmar and Marlon Woods were the team captains.

The Bison were outscored 310 to 151. Their 1–4 conference record tied with Lafayette for fourth place among the six teams eligible for the Patriot League championship. Fordham was excluded from the championship; their games did not count in the Patriot League standings, and they are shown on standings tables below the actual last-place teams, Bucknell and Lafayette. 

Bucknell played its home games at Christy Mathewson–Memorial Stadium on the university campus in Lewisburg, Pennsylvania.

Schedule

References

Bucknell
Bucknell Bison football seasons
Bucknell Bison football